Kudiyon Ka Hai Zamana (Translation: It's a Woman's World) is a Bollywood comedy film directed by Amur Batula. Released on 5 January 2006 it stars Mahima Chaudhry, Rekha and Ashmit Patel. Its central set up is of four female friends and their problems with boyfriends and husbands, and it has been compared to Sex and the City.

Plot
Mayuri, Kanika, Natasha, and Anjali have been friends for many years. All of them come from very wealthy families. While Mayuri has been married four times, she still has feelings for her first husband, Girish, and keeps aloof from her current spouse, Akash; Natasha is married to Punit, and is expecting a child; Kanika is preparing to marry Rahul; while Anjali, who is 24 years of age, is unmarried. All four constantly bet large sums of money on trivial issues, mostly involving men, but only Anjali keeps winning. On the eve of Kanika's marriage, she, Mayuri and Natasha get Anjali to commit in writing that she will only get married after she turns 25, to which she agrees. Now her three friends get together and resolve to find men, who will attempt to marry her before she turns 25. Accordingly, four men attempt to woo Anjali and try to win her heart. Anjali is subsequently willing to marry these men, however, prior to his agreement, she discovers the bet and subsequently refuses to marry any of the men.

Soundtrack

References

External links 
 

2006 films
2000s Hindi-language films